Centropyge is a genus of ray-finned fish, marine angelfish belonging to the family Pomacanthidae found in the Atlantic, Indian and Pacific Ocean. These species do not exceed 15 cm in length and live in haremic structures with one dominant male and multiple females. Although it is hard to identify their gender; females are often shorter and more round finned. Like many other reef fish and all marine angelfish, the species in this genus are protogynous hermaphrodite, meaning that they start their adult lives as females and the dominant individual in a group can change to a male within days. A reversal of this sex change is possible if the social status of the individual changes, it is however a process that requires much more time.

In aquaria
This genus prefer matured reef tanks due to the usually high water quality and the often used "live rock". In nature most species feed on algae, sponges and small benthic invertebrates. Having an abundance of well cured live rock will help to supplement their diet. This is also in the interest of the aquarist, as underfed Centropyge angels may nip at corals and sessile invertebrates. The difficulty of keeping varies from species to species, as does their rarity and correspondingly their price. These species are social that live in loose groups in the wild. So if multiple this genus is kept to a tank, they will establish a pecking order. To reduce the stresses of establishing the dominance in the group it is wise to choose semi-adult specimens or specimens of different size. Dwarf angels can be quite shy initially, hiding in corals, caves and crevices but become more outgoing when they have established their territory - if they are kept with appropriate tank mates and in appropriately sized tanks.

Species
There are currently 35 recognized species in this genus:

References

 
Pomacanthidae
Marine fish genera
Taxa named by Johann Jakob Kaup